RIPL may refer to:

John Marshall Review of Intellectual Property Law
Remote Initial Program Load